Cesarini is an Italian surname and the name of an Italian noble family. Notable people mostly include members of the noble Cesarini family, who held various ecclesiastical titles.

Notable members 
Alessandro Cesarini (died 1542), Italian cardinal
Alessandro Cesarini (footballer) (born 1989), Italian footballer
Alessandro Cesarini (iuniore) (1592–1644), Italian Roman Catholic bishop
Carlo Francesco Cesarini (born 1666), Italian classical composer and violinist
Claudia Cesarini (born 1986), Italian modern pentathlete
David Cesarini, American economist
Davide Cesarini (born 1995), Sammarinese footballer
Ferdinando Cesarini (1604–1646), Italian poet and physicist
Filippo Cesarini (1610–1683), Italian Roman Catholic bishop
Giuliano Cesarini, iuniore (1466–1510), Italian cardinal
Julian Cesarini (1398–1444), Italian cardinal
Nino Cesarini (1889–1943), Italian model
Renato Cesarini (1906–1969), Italian Argentine footballer and manager
Virginio Cesarini (1595–1624), Italian poet and intellectual
 Giovanni Andrea Cesarini. He married Girolama Borgia, an Illegittime daughter of Pope Alexander VI

See also
Cesarini v. United States, a United States district court case
 Ceserani

Italian-language surnames